This is a list of members of the Tasmanian House of Assembly between the 2 May 1964 election and the 10 May 1969 election.

Notes
  Liberal MHA for Denison, Rex Townley, resigned on 30 June 1965. A recount on 10 July 1965 resulted in the election of Liberal candidate George Deas Brown.
  Liberal MHA for Franklin, Thomas Pearsall, resigned to contest the Franklin federal seat at the 1966 election. A recount on 27 November 1966 resulted in the election of Liberal candidate Eric Iles.
  Liberal MHA for Bass, John Steer, died on 10 October 1968. A recount on 25 October 1968 resulted in the election of Liberal candidate James Henty.

Sources
 
 Parliament of Tasmania (2006). The Parliament of Tasmania from 1856

Members of Tasmanian parliaments by term
20th-century Australian politicians